This is a list of earthquakes in 1962. Only magnitude 6.0 or greater earthquakes appear on the list. Lower magnitude events are included if they have caused death, injury or damage. Events which occurred in remote areas will be excluded from the list as they wouldn't have generated significant media interest. All dates are listed according to UTC time. Maximum intensities are indicated on the Mercalli intensity scale and are sourced from United States Geological Survey (USGS) ShakeMap data. The year was characterized by fairly moderate activity. The largest of 10 magnitude 7.0 + earthquakes measured 7.5 and struck Fiji. Iran had the deadliest event with over 12,000 deaths in September. Apart from this there was few other deaths from earthquakes. Colombia had the most with 47 in July.

Overall

By death toll 

 Note: At least 10 casualties

By magnitude 

 Note: At least 7.0 magnitude

Notable events

January

February

March

April

May

June

July

August

September

October

November

December

References

1962
 
1962